Rivet is a surname. Notable people with the surname include:

 André Rivet (1572-1651), French Huguenot theologian
 Craig Rivet (born 1974), Canadian hockey player
 Élise Rivet (1890-1945), Roman Catholic nun and war heroine
 Louis-Alfred-Adhémar Rivet (1873-1951), Canadian lawyer and politician
 Paul Rivet (1876-1958), French ethnologist